DXGB-TV (channel 11) is a television station in Zamboanga City, Philippines, affiliated with TV5. It is owned by Golden Broadcast Professionals, Inc. alongside One Sports affiliate DXDE-TV (channel 29). Both stations share studios and transmitter facilities at the GBPI Bldg., Campaner Street, Zamboanga City.

Background 
With an authority from the NTC to use a 5-kilowatt transmitter granted on March 17, 1992, GBPI TV-11 operates using the city’s first solid-state BTSC stereo TV transmitter. A 4-bay panel TV antenna system coupled to a 260 ft. self-supporting broadcast tower blankets the entire Zamboanga Peninsula with a potential 20 kilowatts ERP signal.

Transmitting from the highest point at the center of downtown Zamboanga City, GBPI TV-11 has the best equipped ”Live-on-Air” studio, and has the capability for outside broadcast. This station is equipped with a 5-meter fiberglass TVRO system which can pull in any satellite signal within footprint view.

As an affiliate of TV5 Network Inc., GBPI TV11 carries most of TV5's national network programming, with local news and independent productions as breakaway from the Manila feed.

Programming

Current Programs
 Dateline TeleRadyo - morning newscast, simulcasted on Magic 95.5 Zamboanga
 Dateline Zamboanga - the flagship Chavacano newscast patterned with former News5's national newscast Aksyon as they use the soundtrack of the latter.
 No Holds Barred - a talk show hosted by Ronnie Lledo
 Beng

Previous aired programs
 Amor con Amor Se Paga
 30 Minutes
 Celso desde Limpapa hasta Licomo
 No Limit - weekly talk show
 S na S!
 Yahoo!
 VEZ TV (Vale el Zamboanga)

Digital television

Digital channels
DXGB-TV currently operates on UHF Channel 51 (695.143 MHz), and is multiplexed into the following subchannels:

Areas of coverage

Primary areas  
 Zamboanga City
 Basilan

Secondary areas 
 Portion of Zamboanga Sibugay
 Portion of Zamboanga del Norte

See also
 TV5
 List of television and radio stations owned by TV5 Network
 Magic 95.5 Zamboanga
 DXAX-DTV - TV5 digital affiated station in Zamboanga
 DWET-TV

References

Television stations in Zamboanga City
TV5 (Philippine TV network) stations
Television channels and stations established in 1992
Digital television stations in the Philippines